McClain is a surname. It is an American variant of the Scottish name McLean. Notable people with the surname include:

Albritton McClain (born 1952), American guitarist
Andrew McClain (1826–1913), Associate judge 
Anne McClain (born 1979), American astronaut and army colonel
Cady McClain (born 1969), American actress
Charly McClain (born 1956), American country music singer
China Anne McClain (born 1998), American actress and singer
Dave McClain (American football) (1938–1986), American football coach
Dave McClain (musician) (born 1965), American drummer
David McClain (president) (contemporary), American academic
Dewey McClain (born 1954), American football player and politician 
Dwayne McClain (born 1963), American basketball player
Edward McClain (Alabama politician) (1944–2020), American politician 
Elijah McClain (1996–2019), African-American man who died in police custody
Elmo McClain (1917–1972), American politician
Emlin McClain (1851–1915), American judge
Frank B. McClain (1864–1925), American politician
Jimmy McClain (born 1980), American football player
John McClain, American sportswriter
Johnathan McClain (contemporary), American stage and television actor
Konnor McClain (born 2005), American artistic gymnast
Leonard MacClain (1899–1967), American organist
Le'Ron McClain (born 1984), American football player
Leanita McClain (1951–1984), American journalist and commentator
Lisa McClain  (born 1966 as Lisa Iovannisci), American politician
Michael Sean McClain (born 1975), American fencer
Patricia McClain (born 1954), American model
Scott McClain (born 1972), American baseball player
Sierra McClain (born 1994), American actress and singer
Steve McClain (born 1962), American basketball coach
Ted McClain (born 1946), American basketball player
Thaddeus McClain (1876–1935), American track and field athlete
Zakoby McClain (born 2000), American football player
 
Fictional people:
Paul McClain, character in the Australian soap opera Neighbours
Shauni McClain, character in the American TV series Baywatch

Other uses
McClain, West Virginia
Thriii, a girl group formerly known as McClain

See also 
Alton McClain and Destiny, 1970s American disco group
McClain Airlines, former U.S. airline of the 1980s
McClain County, Oklahoma, USA
McClain High School (Greenfield, Ohio), USA
McClain Printing Company, American printing company specializing in books of West Virginia history
McClain's Law, American crime drama television series 1981–82
Pratt & McClain, 1970s American commercial singing band
 Clan Maclean
 MacLaine
 McClean (disambiguation)
 McLean

English-language surnames
Surnames of Scottish origin